Zulia Yarizell Menjívar Bermúdez (born 10 June 1992) is a Salvadoran footballer who plays as a midfielder for CD FAS and the El Salvador women's national team.

Club career
Menjívar has played for CD FAS in El Salvador.

See also
List of El Salvador women's international footballers

References

1992 births
Living people
Salvadoran women's footballers
Women's association football midfielders
El Salvador women's international footballers